Conscious breathing is an umbrella term for methods that direct awareness to the breath. These methods may have the goal of improving breathing, or the primary goal can be to build mindfulness. Human respiration is controlled consciously or unconsciously.

Training methods 
Pranayama is part of the Yoga tradition and mainly deals with exercises, such as prolonging in- and outbreaths, holding pauses on the in- or outbreath or both, alternate nostril breathing, or breathing with the glottis slightly engaged etc.
The Buteyko method focuses on nasal breathing, relaxation and reduced breathing.
Coherent Breathing is a method that involves breathing at the rate of five breaths per minute with equal periods of inhalation and exhalation and conscious relaxation of anatomical zones.

Applications

Meditation 
Conscious breathing in meditation usually does not change the depth or rhythm of breathing, but uses breathing as an anchor for concentration and awareness.

Mindfulness and Awareness Trainings use conscious breathing for training awareness and body consciousness.

Vipassana Meditation focuses on breathing in and around the nose to calm the mind (anapanasati).

Psychology and psycho-therapy 
Many breathwork methods claim that breathing can be used to access nonverbal memories.

Rebirthing uses conscious breathing to purge repressed birth memories and traumatic childhood memories.

Holotropic Breathing was developed by Stanislav Grof and uses deepened breathing to allow access to non-ordinary states of consciousness.

Transformational Breath uses a full relaxed breath that originates in the lower abdomen and repeats inhalation and exhalation without pausing. It integrates other healing modalities and breath analysis. A key feature is intensive personal coaching and the use of 'bodymapping' (acupressure points).

Integrative Breathing combines specific benefits of various schools of conscious breathing according to the needs of clients.

Research considers drug abuse disorders, post traumatic stress disorder, alcoholism and smoking.

See also 
 Control of ventilation

References 

Respiration
Meditation
Alternative medicine